Cemetery is the first studio album by the Canadian garage rock band Deja Voodoo. The album was recorded in Studio Secret, save for the title track, which was recorded "in Bob's basement".

Track listing
"Things with You"
"Big Scary Daddy"
"Skeleton at My Party"
"If Mashed Potatoes"
"Long Tall Texan"
"How Can I Miss You"
"Kill Kill Kill"
"I Better Think"
"Voodoo Barbecue"
"Metro Vers L'enfer"
"Crocodile Tears"
"Buy Insurance"
"Eager Beaver Baby"
"Cemetery"
"Strange"
"Jungle Out There"
"Stop"
"Wormtown"
"16 Tons"

Personnel
 Tony Dewald, drums
 Gerard van Herk, guitar/voice

References

1984 debut albums
Deja Voodoo (Canadian band) albums
Og Music albums